

Qualification Criteria
An NOC may qualify a maximum of two divers in each individual event, and one team in each synchronized event.  Entry places will be allocated based on results at the FINA World Championships in 2007, and the FINA Diving World Cup in 2008.  The divers only earn qualification spots for their country, not the divers themselves.

Men's 3m Synchronized Diving

Men's 10m Synchronized Diving

Women's 3m Synchronized Diving

Women's 10m Synchronized Diving

Men's 3m Individual Diving

Men's 10m Individual Diving

Women's 3m Individual Diving

Women's 10m Individual Diving

References

External links 
Beijing 2008 Olympic Games
Federation Internationale de Natation

Qualification for the 2008 Summer Olympics
Qualification